Zenon Kasprzak (born 10 May 1962) is a former international speedway rider from Poland.

Speedway career 
Kasprzak reached the final of the Speedway World Championship in the 1988 Individual Speedway World Championship.

He rode in the top tier of Polish Speedway from 1980-2000, riding for various clubs.

World final appearances

Individual World Championship
 1988 -  Vojens, Speedway Center - 14th - 3pts

References 

1962 births
Living people

Polish speedway riders